Adhisaya Ulagam is a 2012 Indian Tamil-language science fantasy film written and directed by Shakthi Scott and produced by R. Banuchitra. The film stars J. Livingston, Sreelakshmy N. Nair, and Mannan Prithivraj.

This project, combining animation with live action, is marked as India's first 3D film that featured dinosaurs. In the film, Neelakantan, an Indian scientist, invents a time machine through which he and his grandchildren are accidentally transported to the prehistoric world. There they encounter numerous now-extinct animals, including dinosaurs.

The film was released on 10 August 2012 in India. In the director's words, the film received mostly negative reviews majorly because the critics failed to recognize the fact it was made on a zero budget.

Plot 
Professor Neelakantan (J. Livingston) is an maverick Indian scientist and inventor who develops and constructs a time machine and begins experimenting with it. He realizes that his machine requires a recognized "object" to work, and he therefore seeks to locate such an object that can be transported in time through his machine. He jokingly tells his pet dog that he would use it as the "object".

Varsha (Sreelakshmy N. Nair) and Vikas (Mannan Prithivraj) are Neelakantan's mischievous grandchildren who live with their parents and are very fond of their grandfather.  While on a visit, the two children enter Neelakantan's laboratory in his absence and start playing with the dog. Varsha throws a ball that strikes the time machine's control screen and accidentally turns on the device, which recognizes Varsha and Vikas as transferable "objects". Neelakantan enters the room and is shocked to see the machine's condition, but it is too late. As he tries to save the kids, he too is recognized as an "object" by the machine, and he and his grandchildren are accidentally transported to the age of dinosaurs.

In the prehistoric world, Neelakantan and his grandchildren encounter animals that are now extinct, including several species of dangerous dinosaurs. At first, they are afraid and struggle to understand what to do. But gradually, they try to be friends with the dinosaurs. They wish to return to the modern times, but in order to do this, they would need a source of electricity, which does not exist in the prehistoric times they have been transported to. How they survive their circumstances and finally manage to return to their own age is the main plot of the film.

Cast 
  J. Livingston as Neelakantan
 Sreelakshmy N. Nair as Varsha
 Mannan Prithivraj as Vikas
 George Vishnu
 Anandha Kannan
 Latha Rao
 Mannan Prithivraj
 Lena Mohan

Production 

Adhisaya Ulagam 3D was the first Indian 3D film that featured dinosaurs. The film was shot using a Dual Lens Panasonic 3D Camera. The dinosaurs shown in this film were created using computer animation and graphics, and a total of 15 species of dinosaurs were depicted.

The film was produced under the banners of Tittu Productions – Dreamgate Animation. Shakti Scott, who directed of the film, also composed its music, wrote its screenplay, and handled editing and graphics. Before working on the film, Scott had worked on visual effects in a few films, including Eeram and Arundathi.

Release and reception 

The film was released on 10 August 2012 in India. Before its release, Shakthi Scott promised "surprise elements" in the film. Upon release, Adhisaya Ulagam 3D received negative reviews from critics. The Times of India gave the film one out of five stars, saying the director failed as a storyteller and calling it "a bland Jurassic adventure". They described the film plot as a mix of those from Back to the Future and Jurassic Park and found the storytelling and graphic works unimpressive. They wrote, "But when even the five-year-old kids in the theatre get restless, it is a clear sign that the filmmaker has failed as a storyteller."

NowRunning criticized the director's filmmaking and the movie's storyline and graphics. They found the works of the VFX artists "amateurish" and wrote that the film "looks like an unfinished product." Overall, they rated the film "poor" and gave it half out of five stars,

Shakthi Scott participated in a short filmmaking contest conducted by Star World and Steven Spielberg in the year 2007. On the Lot was a single season reality show and online competition for filmmaking, produced by Spielberg, Mark Burnett and David Goffin. Shakthi Scott was selected among 12,000 entries and was the only person to be selected from Asia.

Box office 
The film had a poor opening at the box office and was a commercial flop. According to Behindwoods, in its Chennai theatrical run from 6 to 12 August 2012, the film collected only  and had only 10% theatre occupancy on weekdays.

See also 
Chhota Bheem and the Throne of Bali

References 

2012 films
2012 computer-animated films
Films set in Chennai
Films shot in India
Indian science fiction comedy films
Films about time travel
2010s science fiction comedy films
2012 3D films
Indian 3D films
2010s Tamil-language films
2010s science fiction adventure films
Science fantasy films
Indian science fiction adventure films
2012 directorial debut films
2012 comedy films
Films set in prehistory
Films about dinosaurs